Roberto López Rosado (born 16 February 1961) is a Mexican politician affiliated with the PRD. As of 2013 he served as Deputy of the LXII Legislature of the Mexican Congress representing Oaxaca as replacement of his brother Gabriel.

References

1961 births
Living people
People from Oaxaca
Party of the Democratic Revolution politicians
21st-century Mexican politicians
Deputies of the LXII Legislature of Mexico
Members of the Chamber of Deputies (Mexico) for Oaxaca